The 2014 season is Manchester City Women's Football Club's 26th season of competitive football and its first season in the FA Women's Super League and at the top level of English women's football, having been promoted from the FA Women's Premier League.

In September, the team made club history by reaching their first ever cup final, beating Chelsea to reach the final of the FA WSL Cup. Drawn against Arsenal, they won 1–0 to lift the first major honour in their history.

Non-competitive

Pre-season
N.B. Games against Celtic played as 60-minute matches only. Line-ups rotated between games.

Competitions

Women's Super League

League table

Results summary

Results by matchday

Matches

FA Cup

WSL Cup

Group stage

Knock-out stages

Squad information

Playing statistics

Appearances (Apps.) numbers are for appearances in competitive games only including sub appearances
Red card numbers denote:   Numbers in parentheses represent red cards overturned for wrongful dismissal.

Goalscorers
Includes all competitive matches. The list is sorted alphabetically by surname when total goals are equal.

Correct as of the end of the season

Awards

Football Association England Women's Player of the Year award 
Awarded annually to the player chosen by a public vote on the Football Association website

Transfers

Transfers in

References

14